Tetaz or Tétaz may refer to:

 Eve Tetaz (born 1931), American retired school teacher, and activist
 François Tétaz (born 1970), Australian musician
 Jacques-Martin Tétaz (1818–1865), French architect
 Martín Tetaz (born 1974), Argentine economist and politician
 Nahuel Tetaz Chaparro (born 1989), Argentine rugby player